A time trial bicycle is a racing bicycle designed for use in an individual race against the clock.  Compared to a road bike, a time trial bike is more aerodynamic, has a shorter wheelbase, and puts the rider closer to the front of the bicycle.  It may have either solid disc or spoked wheels.

Since the cyclist in a time trial is not permitted to draft (ride in the slipstream) behind other cyclists, reducing drag of the bicycle and rider is critical.

Time trial bicycles are similar to triathlon bicycles. Triathlon bicycles have a steeper seat tube angle, which pushes the hips forward and saves the hamstrings for the run. TT bicycles have to follow International Cycling Union (UCI) rules. UCI requires that the saddle nose of the TT bicycle must be 5 cm from the centre of the bottom bracket.

See also 

 Outline of cycling
 Time trialist

References

Cycle types
Road bicycle racing terminology